Henry Thomas Lowry-Corry, PC (9 March 1803 – 5 March 1873) was a British Conservative politician, briefly First Lord of the Admiralty.

Background

Lowry-Corry was the younger son of Somerset Lowry-Corry, 2nd Earl Belmore, and Lady Juliana Butler, daughter of Henry Butler, 2nd Earl of Carrick.

Political career

Lowry-Corry entered Parliament for County Tyrone in 1825, a seat he held until his death 48 years later, and was sworn of the Privy Council in 1835. He served as Comptroller of the Household under Sir Robert Peel between 1834 and 1835, as a Civil Lord of the Admiralty under Peel between 1841 and 1845, as First Secretary of the Admiralty under Peel again between 1845 and 1846.  Under Lord Derby between 1858 and 1859 and as Vice-President of the Committee on Education between 1867 and 1867. The latter year Derby promoted him to First Lord of the Admiralty with a seat in the cabinet, a position he held until December 1868, the last nine months under the premiership of Benjamin Disraeli. At the time of his death, he was the longest-serving member of the House of Commons, known as Father of the House.

Family
Lowry-Corry married Lady Harriet Ashley-Cooper, daughter of Cropley Ashley-Cooper, 6th Earl of Shaftesbury by his wife Lady Anne Spencer, fourth daughter of George Spencer, 4th Duke of Marlborough, in 1830 and had issue:

Armar Henry Lowry-Corry (14 March 1836 – 9 September 1893), who was married and had issue
Montagu Corry, 1st Baron Rowton (8 October 1838 – 9 November 1903), who was Private Secretary to Prime Minister Benjamin Disraeli and was created Lord Rowton in 1880.

Lowry-Corry survived his wife Lady Harriet by five years and died on 5 March 1873, aged 69.

References

External links 
 

|-

1803 births
1873 deaths
Irish Conservative Party MPs
First Lords of the Admiralty
Members of the Privy Council of the United Kingdom
Members of the Parliament of the United Kingdom for County Tyrone constituencies (1801–1922)
UK MPs 1820–1826
UK MPs 1826–1830
UK MPs 1830–1831
UK MPs 1831–1832
UK MPs 1832–1835
UK MPs 1835–1837
UK MPs 1837–1841
UK MPs 1841–1847
UK MPs 1847–1852
UK MPs 1852–1857
UK MPs 1857–1859
UK MPs 1859–1865
UK MPs 1865–1868
UK MPs 1868–1874
Younger sons of earls
Henry
Lords of the Admiralty